Igor Zubjuk (born 1961) is a Hungarian handball player. He was born in Kyiv, Ukraine. He played for the Hungarian national handball team and participated at the 1992 Summer Olympics, where Hungary placed 7th after beating the Romanian team in the final match.

References

1961 births
Living people
Sportspeople from Kyiv
Hungarian male handball players
Olympic handball players of Hungary
Handball players at the 1992 Summer Olympics